Colonel David Milne Home (1838 – 19 November 1901) was a British soldier and Conservative politician.

Career
Milne Home was born in Edinburgh, the eldest son of David Milne-Home (thus making him a grandson of Admiral Sir David Milne) and his wife Jean Home, heiress of William Foreman Home. After being educated at Cheltenham College, Trinity College, Cambridge and Edinburgh University, he joined the Royal Horse Guards in 1861.

In politics, Milne Home was elected Member of Parliament (MP) for the English borough constituency of Berwick-upon-Tweed in February 1874. He lost his seat in the 1880 general election, but the election was declared void and he was re-elected at a by-election in July 1880. He retired from parliamentary politics upon his defeat in the Scottish county constituency of Berwickshire in the general election of 1885.

Returning to the army, he served as second in command of the Household Cavalry Regiment in the Anglo-Egyptian War in 1882, and was present in the engagements at El Magfar, Mahamma and Kassassin.  He completed his period of command of the Royal Horse Guards in 1887, promoted to the substantive rank of colonel, he was appointed the 11th Regimental district from 1890 until 1896, when he retired from service with the rank of full colonel.

Family
Milne Home inherited the Home estates from his mother, including Wedderburn Castle and Paxton House, Berwickshire. He married first, in 1867, Jane Buchan Hepburn, second daughter of Sir Thomas Buchan-Hepburn, Bart. After her death, he married Mary Pamela Ellis, daughter of Major Ellis.

Milne Home died 19 November 1901, in the fishing village of Eyemouth, Berwickshire where he had attended a meeting. His eldest son David William Milne Home (1873-1918) was a Captain of the South East Scotland Artillery, and inherited the estates. His grandson John Home Robertson was a Labour MP.

References

Bibliography
 British Parliamentary Election Results 1832-1885, compiled and edited by F.W.S. Craig (The Macmillan Press 1977) 
 British Parliamentary Election Results 1885-1918, compiled and edited by F.W.S. Craig (The Macmillan Press 1974) 
 Who's Who of British Members of Parliament: Volume I 1832-1885, edited by Michael Stenton (The Harvester Press 1976)

External links 

1838 births
1901 deaths
Conservative Party (UK) MPs for English constituencies
UK MPs 1874–1880
UK MPs 1880–1885
Royal Horse Guards officers
Politicians from Edinburgh
British Army personnel of the Anglo-Egyptian War
People educated at Cheltenham College
Alumni of the University of Edinburgh
Alumni of Trinity College, Cambridge